Couples therapy (also couples' counseling, marriage counseling, or marriage therapy) attempts to improve romantic relationships and resolve interpersonal conflicts.

History

Marriage counseling originated in Germany in the 1920s as part of the eugenics movement. The first institutes for marriage counselling in the United States began in the 1930s, partly in response to Germany's medically directed, racial purification marriage counselling centres. It was promoted by prominent American eugenicists such as Paul Popenoe, who directed the American Institute of Family Relations until 1976, Robert Latou Dickinson, and by birth control advocates such as Abraham and Hannah Stone who wrote A Marriage Manual in 1935 and were involved with Planned Parenthood. Other founders in the United States include Lena Levine and Margaret Sanger.

It wasn't until the 1950s that therapists began treating psychological problems in the context of the family. Relationship counseling as a discrete, professional service is thus a recent phenomenon. Until the late 20th century, the work of relationship counseling was informally fulfilled by close friends, family members, or local religious leaders. Psychiatrists, psychologists, counselors and social workers have historically dealt primarily with individual psychological problems in a medical and psychoanalytic framework. In many less technologically advanced cultures around the world today, the institution of the family, the village or group elders fulfil the role of relationship counseling. Today marriage mentoring mirrors those cultures.

With increasing modernization or westernization in many parts of the world and the continuous shift towards isolated nuclear families, the trend is towards trained and accredited relationship counselors or couple therapists. Sometimes volunteers are trained by either the government or social service institutions to help those who are in need of family or marital counseling. Many communities and government departments have their own team of trained voluntary and professional relationship counselors. Similar services are operated by many universities and colleges, sometimes staffed by volunteers from among the student peer group. Some large companies maintain a full-time professional counseling staff to facilitate smoother interactions between corporate employees, and to minimize the negative effects that personal difficulties might have on work performance.

Increasingly there is a trend toward professional certification and government registration of these services. This is in part due to the presence of duty of care issues and the consequences of the counselor or therapist's services being provided in a fiduciary relationship. See also alienation of affection.

Basic principles
It is estimated that nearly 50% of all married couples get divorced, and about one in five marriages experience distress at some time. Challenges with affection, communication, disagreements, and fears of divorce are some of the most common reasons couples reach out for help. Couples who are dissatisfied with their relationship may turn to a variety of sources for help including online courses, self-help books, retreats, workshops, and couples counseling.

Before a relationship between individuals can begin to be understood, it is important to recognize and acknowledge that each person, including the counselor, has a unique personality, perception, opinions, set of values, and history. Individuals in the relationship may adhere to different and unexamined value systems. Institutional and societal variables (like a social or religious group, and other collective factors) which shape a person's nature and behavior, are considered in the process of counseling and therapy. A tenet of relationship counseling, is that it is intrinsically beneficial for all the participants to interact with each other, and with society at large with optimal amounts of conflict. A couple's conflict resolution skills seem to predict divorce rates.

Most relationships will experience strain at some point, resulting in a failure to function optimally, and causing self-reinforcing, maladaptive patterns to form. These patterns may be called "negative interaction cycles." There are many possible reasons for this, including insecure attachment, ego, arrogance, jealousy, anger, greed, poor communication/understanding or problem solving, ill health, third parties, and so on.

Changes in situations, like financial state, physical health, and the influence of other family members can have a profound influence on the conduct, responses, and actions of the individuals in a relationship.

Often, it is an interaction between two or more factors, and frequently, it is not just one of the people who have been involved that exhibit such traits. Relationship influences are reciprocal: it takes each person involved to cause problems, as well as manage them.

A viable solution to the problem, and setting these relationships back on track, may be to reorient the individuals' perceptions and emotions - how one looks at or responds to situations, and how one feels about them. Perceptions of, and emotional responses to, a relationship are contained within an often unexamined mental map of the relationship, also called a 'love map' by John Gottman. These can be explored collaboratively and discussed openly. The core values they comprise can then be understood and respected, or changed when no longer appropriate. This implies that each person takes equal responsibility for awareness of the problem as it arises, awareness of their own contribution to the problem, and making some fundamental changes in thought and feeling.

The next step is to adopt conscious, structural changes to the inter-personal relationships, and evaluate the effectiveness of those changes over time.

Indeed, "typically for those close personal relations, there is a certain degree in 'interdependence' - which means that the partners are alternately mutually dependent on each other. As a special aspect of such relations, something contradictory is put outside: the need for intimacy and for autonomy."

"The common counterbalancing satisfaction these both needs, intimacy, and autonomy, leads to alternate satisfaction in the relationship and stability. But it depends on the specific developing duties of each partner in every life phase and maturity".

Basic practices

Two methods of couples therapy focus primarily on the process of communicating. The most commonly used method is active listening, used by the late Carl Rogers and Virginia Satir. More recently, a method called "Cinematic Immersion" has been developed by Warren Farrell. Each helps couples learn a method of communicating designed to create a safe environment for each partner to express and hear feelings.

When the Munich Marital Study discovered active listening to not be used in the long run, Warren Farrell observed that active listening did a better job creating a safe environment for the criticizer to criticize than for the listener to hear the criticism. The listener, often feeling overwhelmed by the criticism, tended to avoid future encounters. He hypothesized that we were biologically programmed to respond defensively to criticism, and therefore the listener needed to be trained in-depth with mental exercises and methods to interpret as love what might otherwise feel abusive.  His method is Cinematic Immersion.

After 30 years of research into marriage, John Gottman has found that healthy couples almost never listen and echo each other's feelings naturally. Whether miserable or radiantly happy, couples said what they thought about an issue, and "they got angry or sad, but their partner's response was never anything like what we were training people to do in the listener/speaker exercise, not even close."

Such exchanges occurred in less than 5 percent of marital interactions and they predicted nothing about whether the marriage would do well or badly. What's more, Gottman noted, data from a 1984 Munich study demonstrated that the (reflective listening) exercise itself didn't help couples to improve their marriages. To teach such interactions, whether as a daily tool for couples or as a therapeutic exercise in empathy, was a clinical dead end.

By contrast, emotionally focused therapy for couples (EFT-C) is based on attachment theory and uses emotion as the target and agent of change. Emotions bring the past alive in rigid interaction patterns, which create and reflect absorbing emotional states. As one of its founders, Sue Johnson says, Forget about learning how to argue better, analyzing your early childhood, making grand romantic gestures, or experimenting with new sexual positions. Instead, recognize and admit that you are emotionally attached to and dependent on your partner in much the same way that a child is on a parent for nurturing, soothing, and protection. From the book, "Hold Me Tight" by Sue Johnson, Page 6.

Research on therapy
The most researched approach to couples therapy is behavioral couples therapy. It is a well established treatment for marital discord. This form of therapy has evolved into what is now called integrative behavioral couples therapy. Integrative behavioral couples therapy appears to be effective for 69% of couples in treatment, while the traditional model was effective for 50-60% of couples. At five-year follow-up, the marital happiness of the 134 couples who had participated in either integrative behavioral couples therapy or traditional couples therapy showed that 14% of relationships remained unchanged, 38% deteriorated, and 48% improved or recovered completely.

A review conducted in 2018 by Cochrane (organization) states that the available evidence does not suggest that couples therapy is more or less effective than individual therapy for treating depression.

Relationship counselor or couple's therapist
Licensed couple therapists may refer to a psychiatrist, clinical social workers, counseling psychologists, clinical psychologists, pastoral counselors, marriage and family therapists, and psychiatric nurses. The duty and function of a relationship counselor or couples therapist is to listen, respect, understand, and facilitate better functioning between those involved.

The basic principles for a counselor include:
Provide a confidential dialogue, which normalizes and validates feelings
To enable each person to be heard and to hear themselves
Provide a mirror with expertise to reflect the relationship's difficulties and the potential and direction for change
Empower the relationship to take control of its own destiny and make vital decisions
Deliver relevant and appropriate information
Changes the view of the relationship 
Improve communication
Set clear goals and objectives

As well as the above, the basic principles for a couples therapist also include:
To identify the repetitive, negative interaction cycle as a pattern.
To understand the source of reactive emotions that drive the pattern.
To expand and re-organize key emotional responses in the relationship.
To facilitate a shift in partners' interaction to new patterns of interaction.
To create new and positively bonding emotional events in the relationship
To foster a secure attachment between partners.
To help maintain a sense of intimacy.

Common core principles of relationship counseling and couples therapy are:
Respect
Empathy
Tact
Consent
Confidentiality
Accountability
Expertise
Evidence based
Certification and ongoing training

In both methods, the practitioner evaluates the couple's personal and relationship story as it is narrated, interrupts wisely, facilitates both de-escalations of unhelpful conflict and the development of realistic, practical solutions. The practitioner may meet each person individually at first, but only if this is beneficial to both, is consensual, and is unlikely to cause harm. Individualistic approaches to couple problems can cause harm. The counselor or therapist encourages the participants to give their best efforts to reorient their relationship with each other. One of the challenges here is for each person to change their own responses to their partner's behavior. Other challenges to the process are disclosing controversial or shameful events, and revealing closely guarded secrets. Not all couples put all of their cards on the table at first. This can take time, and requires patience, and commitment to the repair of the relationship.

Novel practices
A novel development in the field of couples therapy has involved the introduction of insights gained from affective neuroscience and psychopharmacology into clinical practice.

Oxytocin
There has been interest in use of the so-called love hormone – oxytocin – during therapy sessions, although this is still largely experimental and somewhat controversial. Some researchers have argued oxytocin has a general enhancing effect on all social emotions, since intranasal administration of oxytocin also increases envy and Schadenfreude. Also, oxytocin has also the potential for being abused in confidence tricks.

Popularized methodologies
Although results are almost certainly significantly better when professional guidance is utilized (see especially family therapy), numerous attempts at making the methodologies available generally via self-help books and other media are available. In the last few years, it has become increasingly popular for these self-help books to become popularized and published as an e-book available on the web, or through content articles on blogs and websites. The challenges for individuals utilizing these methods are most commonly associated with that of other self-help therapies or self-diagnosis.

Using modern technologies such as Skype VoIP conferencing to interact with practitioners are also becoming increasingly popular for their added accessibility as well as discarding any existing geographic barriers. Entrusting in the performance and privacy of these technologies may pose concerns despite the convenient structure, especially compared to the comfort of in-person meetings.

Some resources include:

John Gottman's What Makes Marriage Work
The Five Love Languages - what spouses respond to.
Please Understand Me - determining personal psychological makeup.
Sue Johnson's Hold Me Tight - 'Love demands the reassurance of touch. Most fights are really protested over emotional disconnection. Underneath the distress, partners are desperate to know: Are you there for me?
Love & Respect - emotional needs of spouses.
Divorce Busting - solutions for saving and restoring relationships.

With homosexual and bisexual clients 

Differing psychological theories play an important role in determining how effective relationship counseling is, especially when it concerns homosexual and bisexual clients. Some experts tout cognitive behavioral therapy as the tool of choice for intervention, while many rely on acceptance and commitment therapy or cognitive analytic therapy. One major progress in this area is the fact that "marital therapy" is now referred to as "couples therapy"  in order to include individuals who are not married or those who are engaged in same-sex relationships. Most relationship issues are shared equally among couples regardless of sexual orientation, but LGBT clients additionally have to deal with heteronormativity, homophobia, biphobia, and both socio-cultural and legal discrimination. Individuals may experience relational ambiguity from being in different stages of the coming out process or having an HIV serodiscordant relationship. Often, same-sex couples do not have as many role models of successful relationships as opposite-sex couples. In many jurisdictions, committed LGBT couples desiring a family are denied access to assisted reproduction, adoption and fostering, leaving them childless, feeling excluded, other, and bereaved. There may be issues with gender role socialization that do not affect opposite-sex couples.

A significant number of men and women experience conflict surrounding homosexual expression within a mixed-orientation marriage. Couple therapy may include helping the clients feel more comfortable and accepting of same-sex feelings, and to explore ways of incorporating same-sex and opposite-sex feelings into life patterns.  Although a strong homosexual identity was associated with difficulties in marital satisfaction, viewing the same-sex activities as compulsive facilitated commitment to the marriage, and to monogamy.

See also

 Counseling
 Counseling psychology
 Family therapy
 Interpersonal psychotherapy
 List of basic relationship topics
 Relational disorder
 Relationship education
 Sex therapy
 Social work
 List of counseling topics

References

Interpersonal relationships

Marriage